Suryadarma Air Force Base is one of 9 Indonesian Airforce bases on Java. It is named after Suryadi Suryadarma, the first commander-in-chief of the air force. It is located in the village of Kalijati, in the kabupaten of Subang in West Java.

In the time of the Dutch East Indies, the base was the centre for pilots. On 2 March 1942, the colonial Dutch troops based their campaign against the Japanese here. Today, the base is used by helicopter pilots.

It is used by Skadron Udara 7, a team of Bell 47G-3B-1, Bell 204B and Eurocopter EC120 Colibri helicopters.

References

Indonesian Air Force bases
Airports in West Java